David Willicombe (birth unknown) is a Welsh former rugby union and professional rugby league footballer who played in the 1960s, 1970s and 1980s.

Playing career
Willicombe initially played rugby union in Wales for Cardiff International Athletic Club. In his 1974 début for Wigan he scored a hat-trick of tries. Willicombe won caps for Wales (RL) while at Halifax in 1970 against England, while at Wigan in 1975 against France, and England, in the 1975 Rugby League World Cup against France, England, Australia, New Zealand, New Zealand, and France, and in 1978 against France, England, and Australia, and won caps for Great Britain (RL) while at Wigan in 1974 against France (2 matches), and New Zealand.

County Cup Final appearances
David Willicombe played right-, i.e. number 3, and scored a try in Wigan's 13-16 defeat by Workington Town in the 1977 Lancashire County Cup Final during the 1977–78 season at Wilderspool Stadium, Warrington, on Saturday 29 October 1977, and played right-, i.e. number 3 the 10-26 defeat by Warrington in the 1980 Lancashire County Cup Final during the 1980–81 season at Knowsley Road, St. Helens, on Saturday 4 October 1980.

References

External links
!Great Britain Statistics at englandrl.co.uk (statistics currently missing due to not having appeared for both Great Britain, and England)
Statistics at wigan.rlfans.com

Living people
Footballers who switched code
Great Britain national rugby league team players
Halifax R.L.F.C. players
Rugby league centres
Wales national rugby league team players
Welsh rugby league players
Welsh rugby union players
Wigan Warriors players
Year of birth missing (living people)